The 2013 Cleveland mayoral election took place on November 5, 2013, to elect the Mayor of Cleveland, Ohio. Usually a nonpartisan primary is held where the top two candidates move on to the general election, however, incumbent mayor Frank G. Jackson and businessman Kenneth A. Lanci were the only two candidates to file, so no primary election was held.

While the race was officially nonpartisan, both candidates were Democrats.

Results

References

2010s in Cleveland
Cleveland mayoral
Cleveland
Mayoral elections in Cleveland
Non-partisan elections